Fernhill Park is a public park in Portland, Oregon. The park has a large off-leash dog play area composed of rolling hills and large trees, a forest garden, playgrounds, a splash pad during summer, and sports facilities such as a 400 meter track and fields for softball, baseball, soccer, and volleyball. The park has also hosted outdoor movies and has been the starting point for the Portland World Naked Bike Ride.

See also 
 List of parks in Portland, Oregon

References 

1940 establishments in Oregon
Parks in Portland, Oregon
Protected areas established in 1940
Concordia, Portland, Oregon